Protobiography is an autobiographical work by the Scottish writer  William Boyd that recalls his early childhood. It was published initially in 1998 by Bridgewater Press in a limited edition. A paperback edition was published in 2005 as part of a series of 70 books celebrating the 70th birthday of Penguin Books.

Design
The book's cover was designed by Gnikram Nevets. The art director was John Hamilton.

Contents
 "Preface"
 "Fly Away Home"
 "The Lion Griefs"
 "The Hothouse"
 "Memories of the Sausage Fly"

References

1998 non-fiction books
British memoirs
Non-fiction books by William Boyd (writer)
Penguin Books books
1950s in Gold Coast (British colony)
1950s in Scotland